Gain Creek is a stream in the Capital Regional District of British Columbia, Canada. Located on southern Vancouver Island, it flows from its source to its mouth as a right tributary of Loss Creek.

Course
Loss Creek flows to the Strait of Juan de Fuca on the Pacific Ocean.

References

Rivers of Vancouver Island
Juan de Fuca region